Victor James Evans (4 March 1912 – 28 March 1975) was an English cricketer. He played for Essex between 1932 and 1937 as a tail-end batsman and off-break bowler.

References

External links

1912 births
1975 deaths
English cricketers
Essex cricketers
People from Woodford, London
Cricketers from Greater London
English cricketers of 1919 to 1945